Craugastor laticeps (common name: broad-headed rainfrog, and many variations) is a species of frog in the family Craugastoridae.
It is found in Belize, Guatemala, Honduras, and southern Mexico.

Craugastor laticeps occurs in leaf-litter in lowland and premontane tropical forest. It tolerates moderate habitat alteration and can be found in cacao and coffee plantations. There are some threats to this species due to habitat loss.

Reproduction
Craugastor laticeps might be unique among craugastorid frogs (which normally have direct development): one observation suggests that the species is ovoviviparous, ovipositing eggs with fully developed young almost ready to hatch.

References

laticeps
Amphibians of Belize
Amphibians of Guatemala
Amphibians of Honduras
Amphibians of Mexico
Amphibians described in 1853
Taxa named by André Marie Constant Duméril
Taxonomy articles created by Polbot